Mato Grgić (born 27 September 1987) is a Bosnian-born Croatian football defender, who has played for Mumbai City FC in the Indian Super League.

Club career
Born in Kotor Varoš, (now in Bosnia and Herzegovina) Grgić made his senior debut with Croatian Second Football League side Hrvatski Dragovoljac, in the 2012–13 season.

On 1 September 2018, NorthEast United FC signed Grgić from the Croatian side Inter Zaprešić. He was then acquired by Mumbai City FC in advance of the 2019–20 season.

References

External links
Mato Grgić at Sportnet.hr 

1987 births
Living people
People from Kotor Varoš
Association football defenders
Croatian footballers
NK Hrvatski Dragovoljac players
NK Rudeš players
NK Slaven Belupo players
MTK Budapest FC players
NK Inter Zaprešić players
NorthEast United FC players
Mumbai City FC players
NK Zagorec Krapina players
First Football League (Croatia) players
Croatian Football League players
Indian Super League players
Nemzeti Bajnokság I players
Croatian expatriate footballers
Expatriate footballers in Hungary
Croatian expatriate sportspeople in Hungary
Expatriate footballers in India
Croatian expatriate sportspeople in India